Aphelenchoides is a genus of mycetophagous nematodes. Some species are plant pathogenic foliar nematodes.

Taxonomy 
In 1961 Sanwal listed 33 species and provided a key.

The most important species of these are Aphelenchoides ritzemabosi, the chrysanthemum foliar nematode; Aphelenchoides fragariae, the spring crimp or spring dwarf nematode of strawberry, which also attacks many ornamentals; and Aphelenchoides besseyi, causing summer crimp or dwarf of strawberry and white tip of rice.

Several species of this genus feed ectoparasitically and endoparasitically on aboveground plant parts.

References

Bibliography 

 George Agrios (2005): Plant Pathology, Fifth Edition. Elsevier Academic Press

External links 
 Nemaplex, University of California - Aphelenchoides
 EOL Aphelenchoides
 Fauna Europaea

 
Agricultural pest nematodes
Secernentea genera